Achatinella stewartii is a species of air-breathing land snail, a terrestrial pulmonate gastropod mollusk in the family Achatinellidae. This species is endemic to Hawaii.

Achatinella stewartii (Green, 1827) is the type species of the subgenus Achatinellastrum.

References

External links

stewartii
Molluscs of Hawaii
Endemic fauna of Hawaii
Critically endangered fauna of the United States
Gastropods described in 1827
Taxonomy articles created by Polbot
ESA endangered species